Curl PEI, formerly known as Prince Edward Island Curling Association, is the regional governing body for the sport of curling in Prince Edward Island. As one of 14 regional associations within Curling Canada, the organization runs the provincial championships that determine who represents the province in the national championships.

Member clubs 

There are currently seven active curling clubs in Curl PEI:

 Western Community Curling Club
 Maple Leaf Curling Club
 Crapaud Community Curling Club
 Cornwall Curling Club
 Montague Curling Club
 Charlottetown Curling Club
 Silver Fox Curling and Yacht Club

Provincial championships 
Each year Curl PEI hosts 13 provincial championship events:

 PEI tankard (men's)
 Prince Edward Island Scotties Tournament of Hearts (women's)
 Seniors
 Masters
 Club
 Mixed
 Stick
 Junior Mixed
 Juniors (U21)
 U18
 U16
 U13
 Mixed Doubles

References

External links 

 Official website

Curling in Prince Edward Island
Curling governing bodies in Canada
Sports governing bodies in Canada